Giovanni Giuseppe Goria ((30 July 1943 – 21 May 1994) was an Italian politician. He served as the 46th prime minister of Italy from 1987 until 1988.

Biography

Background and early life
Goria was born in Asti (Piedmont).

Goria was an accountant by profession. He joined the Christian Democracy in 1960 and entered local politics. He was elected to the chamber of deputies in 1976. He was undersecretary of the budget from 1981 until 1983 and then became treasury minister. He became known for his easygoing style and his adeptness at television appearances.

Prime Minister of Italy
Following the elections of 1987, in which his party did well, Goria became prime minister (the youngest his country had seen since World War II), as a protégé of party chairman (and prime ministerial successor) Ciriaco De Mita. He was forced to resign in 1988 after the Parliament refused to pass his budget.

Later political roles

Goria was elected to the European Parliament in 1989. He resigned in 1991 to become Italian minister of agriculture. He remained in that position until 1992 when he became finance minister.

He resigned in 1993 during a corruption scandal which ruined his party. Goria himself was charged with corruption. His trial began in early 1994. He was acquitted of one charge, but his trial was still in progress when he died suddenly of lung cancer in his native Asti.

References

External link

1943 births
1994 deaths
People from Asti
Christian Democracy (Italy) politicians
Finance ministers of Italy
Prime Ministers of Italy
Agriculture ministers of Italy
Deputies of Legislature VII of Italy
Deputies of Legislature VIII of Italy
Deputies of Legislature IX of Italy
Deputies of Legislature X of Italy
Deputies of Legislature XI of Italy
Christian Democracy (Italy) MEPs
MEPs for Italy 1989–1994
Politicians of Piedmont
Deaths from lung cancer in Piedmont
Italian accountants